I and Albert is a 1972 musical by composer Charles Strouse, and lyricist Lee Adams. The plot is based on the lives of Queen Victoria and her husband Prince Albert of Saxe-Coburg and Gotha and was adapted for the stage by Jay Presson Allen.

Production
The musical debuted in the West End at the Piccadilly Theatre on 6 November 1972, under the direction of John Schlesinger, but proved a flop, running only for three months, 120 performances. British actress Polly James performed the role of Victoria opposite Sven-Bertil Taube as her husband Prince Albert. Lewis Fiander and Aubrey Woods had featured roles. Sarah Brightman made her stage debut in 1973 in this musical, as Vicky, the queen's eldest daughter, and a street waif, at age 13. Also in the cast was Simon Gipps-Kent as a young Prince Edward ("Bertie"), a role he would later reprise for television in Edward the Seventh.

The musical has not been performed on Broadway.

Songs

Act I 
Vivat! Vivat Regina!
It Has All Begun
Leave It Alone
I've 'Eard the Bloody 'Indoos 'As It Worse
This Gentle Land
This Noble Land
I and Albert
Enough!
Victoria

Act 2
All Glass!
The Genius of Man
The Victoria and Albert Waltz
His Royal Highness
Just You and Me
Draw the Blinds
The Widow at Windsor
No One to Call Me Victoria
When You Speak with a Lady
Go It, Old Girl!
Finale

Recording
The cast album is a studio recording that reunited some of the original principals in London in 1981.

References

External links
Original program

1972 musicals
West End musicals
Musicals by Charles Strouse
Musicals inspired by real-life events
Cultural depictions of Queen Victoria